Anvar Abdukhalilovich Norkulov (born 4 November 1975) is a retired Tajikistani footballer who played for the Tajikistan national football team and who is currently an assistant coach at FC Istiklol.

Career

Managerial
In February 2020, Norkulov was confirmed as an assistant coach to Vitaliy Levchenko at FC Istiklol, having previously worked with Levchenko at Khujand in 2019.

Career statistics

International

Honours
Varzob Dushanbe
Tajik League (2): 1998, 1999
Tajik Cup (2): 1998, 1999
Parvoz Bobojon Gafurov
Tajik Cup (2): 2004, 2007
Vahsh Qurghonteppa
Tajik League (1): 2009
Istiklol
Tajik League (1): 2010
Tajik Cup (1): 2010

References

External links

1975 births
Living people
Tajikistani footballers
Tajikistan international footballers
Association football midfielders